Gail Letzter (born September 12, 1960 in Nyack, New York) is an American mathematician  specializing in the representation theory of quantum groups. Letzter is technical director of the mathematics research group of the National Security Agency.

Education and career
Letzter received her B.A. from Harvard University in 1982 and her Ph.D. in mathematics from the University of Chicago in 1987.  Letzter wrote her Ph.D. dissertation  under I.N. Herstein and was later awarded a National Science Foundation Postdoctoral Fellowship supported by MIT. She held tenured positions in the mathematics departments at Wayne State University and Virginia Tech. In 2006, Letzter moved to the National Security Agency with the title of applied research mathematician, where she currently serves as technical director of the mathematics research group at the rank of defense intelligence senior level.

She served as Lie algebra editor of the Proceedings of the American Mathematical Society from 2007 - 2011.  In 2008 she published a research memoir in the series Memoirs of the American Mathematical Society entitled Invariant Differential Operators for Quantum Symmetric Space. She has been an active member of the Association for Women in Mathematics (AWM), was elected as an at-large member of the executive committee of the association in 2015 and served on that body from 2016 - 2020.  She chaired the AWM policy and advocacy committee from 2016 - 2018. 
She was one of the primary organizers of the 2015 AWM Research Symposium, which was held at the University of Maryland in College Park, Maryland.  She was an editor of the proceedings of this research symposium.

Research
1989 marked the beginning of a long collaboration with Anthony Joseph at the Weizmann Institute in Israel. Their joint investigations of quantum groups included the discovery of the locally finite part and other  contributions, "which greatly contribute to our understanding of quantized enveloping algebras" according to one reviewer. Subsequently, Letzter began her own seminal analysis of quantum symmetric pairs from the perspective of Hopf algebras, culminating in a complete classification.   This work has served as the basis for breakthrough research by others on canonical bases , categorification, and geometric representation theory.

Recognition
Letzter was recognized as a fellow of the Association of Women in Mathematics (AWM) in the class of 2021.  Her citation read "For work in government and in AWM on behalf of women in mathematics, leading the AWM Policy and Advocacy Committee to formally establish the Hill visits program to advocate for women and girls with members of Congress, and co-organizing the 2015 AWM symposium and editing its proceedings".

Books

References

External links
 Gail Letzter's Author Profile Page on MathSciNet

Living people
20th-century American mathematicians
21st-century American mathematicians
Women mathematicians
Harvard University alumni
University of Chicago alumni
Fellows of the Association for Women in Mathematics
Virginia Tech faculty
1960 births